Jēkabpils Municipality is a municipality in Latvia. The municipality was formed in 2009 by merging Ābeļi Parish, Dignāja Parish, Dunava Parish, Kalna Parish, Leimaņi Parish, Rubene Parish and Zasa Parish. During the 2021 Latvian administrative reform, the previous municipality was merged with Aknīste Municipality, Krustpils Municipality, Sala Municipality and Viesīte Municipality. The new municipality now fully corresponds with the area of the former Jēkabpils District.

The administrative centre is the city of Jēkabpils. Until 2021, the city was also a separate first-level municipality (republican city) at the same time. 

In 2020 the population of the municipality was 4,156.

Symbols (2009–2021) 
The coat of arms and the flag used until the 2021 Latvian administrative reform were abolished after the changes in the boundaries of the municipality, with new sketches being unveiled in August 2022. The sketches will need to be approved by the Heraldry Commission of Latvia before use.

See also 
 Administrative divisions of Latvia (2009)

References 

 
Municipalities of Latvia